Bernard Delcampe (12 September 1932 – 8 January 2013) was a French footballer who played as a forward.

Starting his career at Stade de Reims, he joined AS Troyes-Savinienne in 1952. He was a finalist in the Coupe de France with the Troyens in 1956. He later coached Stade Poitevin from 1967 to 1975.

Honours 
 Coupe de France finalist 1956 with AS Troyes-Savinienne

References

French footballers
Stade de Reims players
AS Troyes-Savinienne players
1932 births
2013 deaths
Association football forwards
Sportspeople from Ardennes (department)
Footballers from Grand Est